Emer Bog and Baddesley Common is a   nature reserve north of North Baddesley in Hampshire. It is managed by the Hampshire and Isle of Wight Wildlife Trust.

Most of this site is valley bog, together with damp grassland, heath and woods. The bog is not grazed and it has a rich flora and fauna, including many moths. Plants include reed, marsh cinquefoil and bog bean. There is also an area of acidic grassland with a rich flora.

References

 

Hampshire and Isle of Wight Wildlife Trust
Sites of Special Scientific Interest in Hampshire
Special Areas of Conservation in England